Ernst-Johann Nicholas Ernestovich Lissner (1874–1941) was a Russian painter and graphic artist, owner of a private art studio and the printing press "E. Lissner and J. Roman" in Moscow. He is best known by a series of historical paintings and lithographs devoted to the Polish–Muscovite War (1605–1618) and the Seven Years' War.

Life and career
Lissner was born in the family of the merchant Ernest-Konstantin Antonovich Lissner (1837 – after 1897), who came from the Russified Austrian nobility. His father owned a well-known printing house on the Arbat, in which prestigious orders were executed.

Between 1900 to 1908 he studied at the Imperial Academy of Fine Arts in Saint Petersburg. His graduate work was a painting named Greetings to you, heroes of labor. From 1909 he participated in Art exhibitions, being an exhibitor and member of various associations of visual artists and art societies, such as the Society for Travelling Art Exhibitions, the Society of Artists Free Arts (1911–1918), and others.

After the October Revolution of 1917 and the Russian Civil War, Lissner continued to work as painter, and also actively took part in the turbulent social and artistic life of the first decade of the Soviet Union. In the 1920s he became a member of Moscow groups and associations of soviet artists, such as Art to working people (1925–1928), Wing (1926–1928), and the Repin Society of painters (1924–1929).

Works
The beginning of a battle between the Bolotnikov army and Tsarist troops in Lower Kotlov near Moscow
Battle of the Nikitsky Gate in October 1917
The expulsion of Polish invaders from the Kremlin, Moscow
The uprising in Moscow in 1648

Gallery

References

Attribution
This article is based on the translation of the corresponding article of the Russian Wikipedia. A list of contributors can be found there at the History section.

1874 births
1941 deaths
Russian romantic painters
20th-century Russian painters
Russian male painters
20th-century Russian male artists